Jinny were an Italian 1990s band consisting of Alessandro Gilardi, Claudio Varola, Federico Di Bonaventura and Walter Cremonini and featured various singers including Sandy Chambers and Carryl Varley as a lip-synching model for the music videos. Their most successful single is "Keep Warm", which was released in 1991 and re-released in 1995.

Discography

Singles

References

Italian Eurodance groups
Italian dance music groups
Italian house music groups